The 1924 United States elections was held on November 4. The Republican Party retained control of the presidency and both chambers of Congress.

In the presidential election, Republican President Calvin Coolidge (who took office on August 2, 1923, upon the death of his predecessor, Warren G. Harding) was elected to serve a full term, defeating Democratic nominee, former Ambassador John W. Davis and Progressive Senator Robert M. La Follette, Sr. from Wisconsin. Coolidge easily won the election, taking almost every state outside the Solid South. Davis won the Democratic nomination after a record 103 ballots, emerging as a compromise candidate between Treasury Secretary William Gibbs McAdoo and New York Governor Al Smith. La Follette, a former Republican who had sought the 1912 Republican nomination, drew sixteen percent of the popular vote and won his home state of Wisconsin.

The Republicans gained twenty-two seats in the House of Representatives, increasing their majority over the Democrats. The Republicans also furthered a majority in the Senate, gaining four seats from the Democrats.

See also
1924 United States presidential election
1924 United States House of Representatives elections
1924 United States Senate elections
1924 United States gubernatorial elections

References

 
1924